Carlos Issamu Kawai (born July 30, 1969) is a Brazilian table tennis player. He competed in men's singles and men's doubles with Claudio Kano at the 1988 Summer Olympics and men's doubles with Hugo Hoyama at the 2000 Summer Olympics.

References

External links
 
 
 
 

1969 births
Living people
Brazilian male table tennis players
Olympic table tennis players of Brazil
Table tennis players at the 1988 Summer Olympics
Table tennis players at the 2000 Summer Olympics
Pan American Games medalists in table tennis
Pan American Games gold medalists for Brazil
Pan American Games bronze medalists for Brazil
Brazilian people of Japanese descent
Table tennis players at the 1987 Pan American Games
Table tennis players at the 1991 Pan American Games
Table tennis players at the 1995 Pan American Games
Table tennis players at the 1999 Pan American Games
Medalists at the 1987 Pan American Games
Medalists at the 1991 Pan American Games
Medalists at the 1995 Pan American Games
Medalists at the 1999 Pan American Games
People from Santo André, São Paulo
Sportspeople from São Paulo (state)
20th-century Brazilian people